Singularity is a solo album by American jazz guitarist Joe Morris, which was recorded in 2000 and released on the AUM Fidelity label.

Reception

In his review for AllMusic, Glenn Astarita states "the guitarist's beaming individuality comes to prominence on this expertly and altogether fascinating exhibition consisting of jarring single note lines, fragmented micro-themes, abstract blues-based motifs, and rapid fire chord progressions."

The Penguin Guide to Jazz notes that "The themes are all quite abstract but the playing remains close to the blues and to jazz harmony and Morris's ability to keep several ideas in sight at once means that Singularity is almost inexhaustible as a listening experience."

In his review for JazzTimes Daniel Piotrowski notes that "Singularity is a breathtaking chops exercise, but not as compelling as an album."

Track listing
All compositions by Joe Morris
 "Light" – 5:59
 "Gravity" – 2:53
 "Creature" – 3:46
 "Shape" - 3:58
 "Atmosphere" – 5:34
 "Sense" – 4:50
 "Liquid" – 3:24
 "Dimension" - 4:23
 "Flight" – 5:18
 "Rock" – 3:55

Personnel
Joe Morris - steel string acoustic guitar

References

2001 albums
Joe Morris (guitarist) albums
AUM Fidelity albums